Kurt Wæde Petersen (born 2 December 1934) is a former speedway rider who was a four times champion of Denmark and the 1964 world longtrack champion.

Speedway career
Petersen was a four times champion of Denmark, winning the Danish Championship in 1960 to 1963.

He competed in nine World Longtrack Championship Finals and became a world champion after winning the 1964. He was the Denmark Longtrack Champion eleven times, in 1959, 1960, 1961, 1962, 1963, 1964, 1965, 1966, 1967, 1968 and 1969.

He rode in the top tier of British Speedway in 1961, riding for Norwich Stars.

Speedway World Final appearances

World Longtrack Championship
 1963  Malmö (Second) 16pts
 1964  Scheeßel (Champion) 15pts
 1965  Seinajoki (10th) 8pts
 1966  Mühldorf (Second) 16pts
 1967  Scheeßel (4th) 10pts
 1968  Mühldorf (Third) 12pts
 1969  Oslo (Third) 11pts
 1970  Scheeßel (11) 7pts
 1971  Oslo (12th) 7pts

Nordic Final
 1961  Malmö (14th) 6pts

World Pairs Championship
 1968 -  Kempten (with Jens Hauser) - 6th - 6pts (2)

References 

1934 births
Living people
Danish speedway riders
Norwich Stars riders
Individual Speedway Long Track World Championship riders